The 2017 Vancouver International Film Festival, the 36th event in the history of the Vancouver International Film Festival, was held from September 28 to October 13, 2017. 

The festival's opening gala film was Mina Shum's Meditation Park, and its closing gala was Todd Haynes's Wonderstruck; during the festival, a special gala was also dedicated to Guy Maddin's film The Green Fog, with its score performed live in the theatre by the Kronos Quartet.

Awards
Award winners were announced on October 13.

Films

Special Presentations
Borg vs McEnroe — Janus Metz Pedersen
Breathe — Andy Serkis
Call Me by Your Name — Luca Guadagnino
A Fantastic Woman (Una mujer fantástica) — Sebastián Lelio
The Florida Project — Sean Baker
Happy End — Michael Haneke
The Killing of a Sacred Deer — Yorgos Lanthimos
Loving Vincent — Dorota Kobiela, Hugh Welchman
Mountain — Jennifer Peedom
The Square — Ruben Östlund
Top of the Lake: China Girl — Jane Campion, Ariel Kleiman

Contemporary World Cinema
7 Minutes — Michele Placido
At the End of the Tunnel — Rodrigo Grande
Azar — Mohammad Hamzei
Beauty and the Dogs — Kaouther Ben Hania
The Bolshoi — Valery Todorovsky
Casting — Nicolas Wackerbarth
Cocote — Nelson Carlo de Los Santos Arias
Columbus — Kogonada
The Desert Bride — Cecilia Atán, Valeria Pivato
Directions — Stephan Komandarev
Disappearance — Boudewijn Koole
The Divine Order — Petra Volpe
The Dragon Defense — Natalia Santa
Farewell (Abscheid von den Eltern) — Astrid Johanna Ofner
Félicité — Alain Gomis
Gabriel and the Mountain — Fellipe Gamarano Barbosa
Garden Store: Family Friend — Jan Hřebejk
God's Own Country — Francis Lee
Golden Exits — Alex Ross Perry
Good Manners (As Boas Maneiras) — Marco Dutra, Juliana Rojas
Holy Air — Shady Srour
Hotel Salvation (Mukti Bhawan) — Shubhashish Bhutiani
Ice Mother (Bába z ledu) — Bohdan Sláma
In the Fade — Fatih Akin
The Insult — Ziad Doueiri
The King's Choice (Kongens nei) — Erik Poppe
Last Days in Havana (Últimos días en La Habana) — Fernando Pérez
The Line — Peter Bebjak
Lipstick Under My Burkha — Alankrita Shrivastava
Loveless (Нелюбовь) — Andrey Zvyagintsev
Lucky — John Carroll Lynch
The Nest of the Turtledove (Гніздо горлиці) — Taras Tkachenko
Newton — Amit V. Masurkar
The Nile Hilton Incident — Tarik Saleh
No Bed of Roses — Mostofa Sarwar Farooki
No Date, No Signature (بدون تاریخ، بدون امضا) — Vahid Jalilvand
On the Seventh Day (En el séptimo día) — Jim McKay
The Other Side of Hope (Toivon tuolla puolen) — Aki Kaurismäki
The Party — Sally Potter
Los Perros — Marcela Said
The Queen of Spain (La reina de España) — Fernando Trueba
Reseba: The Dark Wind — Hussein Hassan
Sami Blood (Sameblod) — Amanda Kernell
Scary Mother (Sashishi Deda) — Ana Urushadze
Sexy Durga — Sanal Kumar Sasidharan
Son of Sofia (O gios tis Sofias) — Elina Psykou
Sour Apples (Ekşi Elmalar) — Yılmaz Erdoğan
Summer 1993 (Estiu 1993) — Carla Simón
Swallows and Amazons — Philippa Lowthorpe
Sweet Virginia — Jamie M. Dagg
Tales of Mexico (La Habitación) — Natalia Beristáin, Carlos Bolado, Carlos Carrera, Ernesto Contreras, Daniel Giménez Cacho, Alfonso Pineda Ulloa, Alejandro Valle, Iván Ávila Dueñas
Tehran Taboo (تهران تابو) — Ali Soozandeh
Tenderness (La Tenerezza) — Gianni Amelio
That Trip We Took with Dad (Die Reise mit Vater) — Anca Miruna Lăzărescu
Thelma — Joachim Trier
Thirst Street — Nathan Silver
Tom of Finland — Dome Karukoski
Vazante — Daniela Thomas
Western — Valeska Grisebach
Winter Brothers (Vinterbrødre) — Hlynur Pálmason
The Wound (Inxeba) — John Trengove
The Young Karl Marx — Raoul Peck

Spotlight on France
Ava — Léa Mysius
BPM (Beats per Minute) — Robin Campillo
Dalida — Lisa Azuelos
Django — Étienne Comar
Faces Places — Agnès Varda, JR
Ismael's Ghosts (Les Fantômes d'Ismaël) — Arnaud Desplechin
Milla — Valérie Massadian
A Season in France (Une Saison en France) — Mahamat Saleh Haroun
The Valley of the Wolves (La Vallée des loups) — Jean-Michel Bertrand
The Workshop (L'Atelier) — Laurent Cantet

Documentaries
24 Frames (۲۴ فریم) — Abbas Kiarostami
AlphaGo — Greg Kohs
Armed with Faith — Asad Faruqi, Geeta Gandbhir
Bombshell: The Hedy Lamarr Story — Alexandra Dean
Caniba — Véréna Paravel, Lucien Castaing-Taylor
Did You Wonder Who Fired the Gun? — Travis Wilkerson
Dina — Daniel Sickles, Antonio Santini
Dirtbag: The Legend of Fred Beckey — Dave O'Leske
The Farthest — Emer Reynolds
Good Luck — Ben Russell
Machines — Rahul Jain
Maineland — Miao Wang
A Marriage Story (Strnadovi) — Helena Třeštíková
Searching for a New Science — David Malone
Untitled — Michael Glawogger, Monika Willi
West of the Jordan River — Amos Gitai

True North
Black Cop — Cory Bowles
Eye on Juliet — Kim Nguyen
Fail to Appear — Antoine Bourges
Fake Tattoos (Les faux tatouages) — Pascal Plante
Forest Movie — Matthew Taylor Blais
In the Waves — Jacquelyn Mills
Infiltration (Le problème d’infiltration) — Robert Morin
Like a Pebble in the Boot (Comme un caillou dans la botte) — Hélène Choquette
Maison du Bonheur — Sofia Bohdanowicz
Mass for Shut-Ins — Winston DeGiobbi
Our People Will Be Healed — Alanis Obomsawin
Prototype — Blake Williams
Rebels on Pointe — Bobbi Jo Hart
A Skin So Soft (Ta peau si lisse) — Denis Côté
Still Night, Still Light (Mes nuits feront écho) — Sophie Goyette
Suck It Up — Jordan Canning
Unarmed Verses — Charles Officer
Worst Case, We Get Married (Et on pire, on se mariera) — Léa Pool
You're Soaking in It — Scott Harper

Gateway
2 Cool 2 Be 4gotten — Petersen Vargas
Anarchist from Colony — Lee Joon-ik
Angkor Awakens — Robert H. Lieberman
Bad Genius — Nattawut Poonpiriya
A Beautiful Star — Daihachi Yoshida
Becoming Who I Was — Moon Chang-yong, Jeon Jin
Burma Storybook — Petr Lom
Claire's Camera — Hong Sang-soo
Close-Knit — Naoko Ogigami
The Departure — Lana Wilson
Dragonfly Eyes — Xu Bing
The First Lap — Kim Dae-hwan
A Fish Out of Water — Lai Kuo-An
The Foolish Bird — Huang Ji, Ryuji Otsuka
The Great Buddha+ — Huang Ji, Ryuji Otsuka
Gukoroku: Traces of Sin — Kei Ishikawa
Have a Nice Day — Liu Jian
The Hidden Sword — Xu Haofeng
Honeygiver Among the Dogs — Dechen Roder
I've Got the Blues — Angie Chen
In Time to Come — Tan Pin Pin
King of Peking — Sam Voutas
The Last Roar of a Mother Bear — Doug Chan
Marlina the Murderer in Four Acts — Mouly Surya
Motherland — Ramona S. Diaz
Okja — Bong Joon-ho
Paradox — Wilson Yip
Sweating the Small Stuff — Ryutaro Ninomiya

Sea to Sky
Adventures in Public School — Kyle Rideout
cə̓snaʔəm, the city before the city — Elle-Máijá Tailfeathers
Dead Shack — Peter Ricq
Entanglement — Jason James
Gregoire — Cody Bown
Hollow in the Land — Scooter Corkle
Indian Horse — Stephen Campanelli
Luk'Luk'I — Wayne Wapeemukwa
Meet Beau Dick: Maker of Monsters — LaTiesha Fazakas, Natalia Tudge
Never Steady, Never Still — Kathleen Hepburn
On Putin's Blacklist — Boris Ivanov
Once There Was a Winter — Ana Valine
Shut Up and Say Something — Melanie Wood

Impact
ACORN and the Firestorm — Reuben Atlas, Sam Pollard
Blue — Karina Holden
Evolution of Organic — Mark Kitchell
Frank Serpico — Antonino D'Ambrosio
Hondros — Greg Campbell
Human Flow — Ai Weiwei
Keep Talking — Karen Lynn Weinberg
The Trial: The State of Russia vs Oleg Sentsov — Askold Kurov
The Venerable W — Barbet Schroeder
A Yangtze Landscape — Chang Jiang

M/A/D
Beuys: Art as a Weapon — Andres Veiel
Big Time — Kaspar Astrup Schröder
Bosch: The Garden of Dreams (El Bosco, el jardin de los sueños) — José Luis López Linares
Bunch of Kunst — Christine Franz
Chaplin in Bali: Journey to the East — Raphaël Millet
Chavela — Catherine Gund, Daresha Kyi
Clive Davis: The Soundtrack of Our Lives — Chris Perkel
David Hockney at the Royal Academy of Arts — Phil Grabsky
Leaning Into the Wind: Andy Goldsworthy — Thomas Riedelsheimer
Louise Lecavalier in Motion — Raymond St-Jean
Planeta Petrila — Andrei Dascalescu
Schumann's Bar Talks — Marieke Schroeder
Shadowman — Oren Jacoby
Song of Granite — Pat Collins
Streetscapes (Dialogue) — Heinz Emigholz
Where You're Meant to Be — Paul Fegan

Altered States
Animals (Tiere) — Greg Zglinski
Bad Day for the Cut — Chris Baugh
Bitch — Marianna Palka
The Crescent — Seth A. Smith
The Endless — Justin Benson, Aaron Moorhead
Friendly Beast (O Animal Cordial) — Gabriela Amaral Almeida
Housewife — Can Evrenol
Lowlife — Ryan Prows
Tiger Girl — Jakob Lass
Tragedy Girls — Tyler MacIntyre

Canadian Short Films
Alice Ayalik — Reel Youth
Anne Doll — Levi Marshall
Bickford Park — Linsey Stewart, Dane Clark
Bird — Molly Parker
Birdlime — Evan Derushie
Bunbun Blast — Drake Tuura
Cherry Cola — Joseph Amenta
Crème de menthe — Jean-Marc E. Roy, Philippe David Gagné
The Crying Conch — Vincent Toi
Do We Leave This Here — Julia Hutchings
Etymology — Faith Paré
Fence — Alexis Fortier Gauthier
Flood — Amanda Strong
From Here To — Darynn Bednarczyk
Full Moon Party — Gabriel Adelman
The Glow Is Gone — Ryan Ermacora
Go Play Outside — Adib Alkhalidey
The Good Fight — Mintie Pardoe
Grandmother (ʔEtsu) — Trevor Mack
His Name Is Willy — Liz Cairns
Idizwadidiz — Isiah Medina
It Just Might Be True — Evan McDermot, Samantha Campbell
The Knits — Lisa Birke
Let Your Heart Be Light — Deragh Campbell, Sophy Romvari
Life Goes On: John Dub — Moe Yang
Lights Beneath My Feet — Laz
Lira's Forest — Connor Jessup
Lost Paradise Lost — Yan Giroux
Lower Plenty Garden Views — Adrian St. Louis
Manivald — Chintis Lundgren
The Martyr — Devan Scott, Will Ross
Memory of the Peace — Jennifer Chiu, Jean Parsons
Milk — Heather Young
The Mountain of SGaana — Christopher Auchter
La Pesca — Pablo Alvarez-Mesa, Fernando López Escrivá
Refugee Rescue — Richard Yang
Rupture — Yassmina Karajah
Scaffold — Kazik Radwanski
Scratchy — Marv Newland
Sea Monster — Daniel Rocque, Kassandra Tomczyk
Shadow Nettes — Phillip Barker
Slap Happy — Madeleine Sims-Fewer, Dusty Mancinelli
The Tesla World Light — Matthew Rankin
There Lived the Colliers — Nelson MacDonald
Thug — Daniel Boos
Voices of Kidnapping — Ryan McKenna
When Food Goes Bad — Ben Sprenger
Where Do Cats Go After 9 Lives? — Marion Duhaime
A Woman on the Telephone: Carol — Erica Généreux Smith

International Short Films
100 Second Red Light — Navid Zare
Afterglow — Akira Kamiki
American Psychosis — Amanda Zackem
The Animal — Atasay Koç
Backstory — Joschka Laukeninks
Ballooinator — Joshua Siegel
Bullroarer — Francesco Saviano
C.O.D. — Onur Dogan
Canton Novelty — Fang Lu
Chasing Stars — Markus Eichenberger
Damn Bro! — Travis Frick
Divide — Rabbia Arshad, Alysha Siddigi, Jamil Ur Rehman
Don't Be Afraid of the Light — Jason A. Rostovsky
The Fashion Show — Lucy Lumsden
Flag — Matan Ben Moreh
Forever Now — Kristian Haskjold
Game — Jeannie Donohoe
The Good Girls — Clara Roquet
High Moon — David Zhu
Home, Sweet Home — Carlos Polo
Hsiang Yi — Wu Zi En
Hunger — Alejandro Montalvo
I Love You Forever Now — Youyang Yu
Images of Nowhere — Rubén Guzmán
Invisible Line — Shahnawaz Chachar, Sourath Behan, Danial Shah
The Kodachrome Elegies — Jay Rosenblatt
Land of Happy Dreams — Josh Auter
The Language of Ball — Ramon Rodriguez
Life Is Lifeless — Hawar Rahimi
Lunar Dial — Gao Yuan
Marlon — Jessica Palud
Maxwell's Demon — Marcos Vaz
Munchies — Sinéad Stoddart
Nobody Likes You — Mark Sean Haynes, Kelly Wydryk
Outlines — Ellie Rogers
Overlove — Lucas Helth
Promise — Neville Pierce
Rhythm of Being — Giada Ghiringhelli
Royal Fool — Saba Karseladze
Say No to Early Sex — Alusine Kamara, Susan Kargbo, Ibrahim Kamara, Mariama Kargbo
Shepherd's Purse — Dong Hao
Sissyman — Joshua Atesh Little
Sisters — Toni Kamula
Talking Too Loud — Abel Rubinstein, Georgia Milton
There Was a Man, a Girl and a Rocket — Terence Chim
7ún3l — Klych López
TV in the Fish Tail — Iesh Thapar
Walk of Shame — Maisie Buck
Walt & Me — Yaz Canli
Wardrobe — Pranav Bhasin
Wave — Benjamin Cleary, T.J. O'Grady Peyton
We Belong — Jeremy Herron
Who Is in Charge Here? — Studio Da
Yes, God, Yes — Karen Maine

Modes
489 Years — Hayoun Kwon
Batrachian's Ballad — Leonor Teles
Charged Landscapes — Sara Naomi Goodman
Find Fix Finish — Sylvain Cruiziat, Mila Zhluktenko
Green Screen Gringo — Douwe Dijkstra
Jardins d'été — Quayola
Martin Cries — Jonathan Vinel
A Photo of Me — Dennis Tupicoff
Roadside Attraction — Iveta Lucas, Patrick Bresnan
Strange Says the Angel — Shalimar Preuss
Studies on the Ecology of Drama — Eija-Liisa Ahtila
A Tall Tale — Maya Schweizer
Tashlikh (Cast Off) — Yael Bartana

References

Vancouver
Vancouver
Vancouver
Vancouver International Film Festival